is a Japanese former gymnast who competed in the 1984 Summer Olympics. Kajitani is a graduate of the Nippon College of Physical Education.

References

1955 births
Living people
Japanese male artistic gymnasts
Olympic gymnasts of Japan
Gymnasts at the 1984 Summer Olympics
Olympic silver medalists for Japan
Olympic bronze medalists for Japan
Olympic medalists in gymnastics
Asian Games medalists in gymnastics
Gymnasts at the 1978 Asian Games
Gymnasts at the 1982 Asian Games
Asian Games silver medalists for Japan
Medalists at the 1978 Asian Games
Medalists at the 1982 Asian Games
Medalists at the 1984 Summer Olympics
Academic staff of Okayama University
20th-century Japanese people